Honeywell offers a number of products and services across its four business groups: Aerospace, Home and Building Technologies (HBT), Safety and Productivity Solutions (SPS), and Performance Materials and Technologies (PMT). This is a partial list of products manufactured and services offered by Honeywell.

Aerospace
Aerospace produces integrated avionics systems, engines, navigation & radios, flight management services, and cockpit displays.

Actuation Systems
 Aspire 200 Satellite Communications System
 Automatic Identification System (AIS) / RF Receivers
 Auxiliary Power Units (APUs)
 BendixKing 
 Garrett TPE331
 GoDirect Services
 GPS and Global Navigation System Sensor Units
 HG1120 IMU
 Honeywell RQ-16 T-Hawk
 Honeywell HTF7000
 Honeywell HTS900
 Primus Epic Radio System
 Primus II Radio System
 Radio Management Unit (RMU)
 RUR-5 ASROC
 SmartRunway and SmartLanding
 Turbochargers
 Turbocharged petrol engines
 Variable-geometry turbochargers
 Wagtail (missile)- Discontinued early 1960s.

Home and Building Technologies
Home and Building Technologies produces burglar alarms, Inncom hotel management systems, and a wide variety of sensors.

 Access Systems
 Air Purifiers
 Ball Valve & Actuator
 Biometric Readers
 Building Operation Expert (BOE) 
 Butterfly Valve & Actuator
 Cable Management
 Circuit Protection
 Comfort Point Open
 Command and Control Suite
 Damper Actuator (or DCA)
 Digital Video Manager
 equIP Camera Series
 Electrical Balancing Valve - Kombi Series
 Electrical Sub-meter
 Emergency Lighting
 Enterprise Buildings Integrator
 ESPCs (energy service performance contracting)
 eVance Facility Manager
 Fire Alarm Aspiration Sensing Technology™ (FAAST™)
 Fire IOT Platform
 Fire Protection Gas Suppression System
 Fire Sprinkler Monitoring
 Gas leak detectors
 Globe Valve & Actuator
 Honeywell Excel Series
 Honeywell's Smart Home Security Starter Kit
 Honeywell Guest Room Control
 Honeywell Public Address and Voice Alarm (PAVA) products
 Honeywell Pulse for Connected Buildings
 Honeywell SymmetrE
 Honeywell Vector Occupant App
 Honeywell WEBs N4 - Niagara
 Honeywell WEBs-EXP (Energy Expert)
 HUS (Honeywell Universal Surveillance)
 HVAC Controls
 Integrated Utility Tunnel Platform (IUT)
 LobbyWorks Visitor Management Suite
 Integrated Utility Tunnel Platform (IUT)
 MAXPRO Cloud Alarm Monitor
 MAXPRO Video Management System
 Mechanical Balancing Valve
 Mechanical Pressure Independent Control Valve
 Network Video Recorders
 Notifications – Horn, Strobe, Speaker
 ONYX® Series Intelligent Fire Systems
 Outcome Based Service
 Performance Lite IP camera series
 Pneumatic Control Valve
 Pro-Watch Security Management System
 Sensors (Temperature, Humidity, T/H, CO, DPS, Flow)
Smoke detectors
 Specialty Detection – Flame, Beam, CO, Thermal Sensing Cable
 Standalone Fire Alarm
Thermostats
 Honeywell T87, its classic "Round" thermostat
 Variable Air Volume (VAV) Controller, Wall Module and Box
 Variable Frequency Drive (VFD)
 Warehouse Automation
Water Purifiers
 WIN-PAK software suite
 Wireless intrusion alarm systems - ARMOR 300
 Wiring Device

Safety and Productivity Solutions
Safety and Productivity Solutions produces voice-directed software solutions and ruggedized handheld computers.

 Automated material handling solutions
 Barcode scanners and readers
 Controls and monitors
 Eye, face and hearing protection
 Fall Protection
 First Aid
 First Responder Gear
 Gas detection systems
 Gas detection
 Hand Protection
 Head Protection
 Honeywell AIDC products
 Honeywell Integrated
 Honeywell Voice Maintenance & Inspection
 Howard Leight hearing protection
 Electrical safety products
 Head Protection
 Industrial printers
 Intermec Products
 Lockout-Tagout
 Oliver safety boots
 Print media
 Professional Footwear
 RFID technology
 Respiratory systems
 Industrial handheld computers
 Sensors
 Switches
 Test and measurement products
 Voice-directed software solutions

Performance Materials and Technologies
Performance Materials and Technologies produces Spectra Shield, Solstice refrigerants, and the Honeywell Connected Plant.

 Honeywell Connected Plant
 Spectra Shield
 Solstice
 Experion PKS

References

Honeywell